Denys Oleksandrovych Nahnoynyi (born 3 February 2002) is a Ukrainian professional football defender who plays for Zorya Luhansk.

Career
Born in Varva, Nahnoynyi is a product of the neighbouring Yevropa Pryluky and UFK-Metal Kharkiv youth sportive school systems.

Zorya Luhansk
In August 2019 he was signed by Zorya Luhansk and he made his debut for this club in the Ukrainian Premier League as a second half-time substituted player in the winning home match against Oleksandriya on 9 May 2021.

References

External links
 
 

2002 births
Living people
People from Varva, Chernihiv Oblast
Kharkiv State College of Physical Culture 1 alumni
Ukrainian footballers
Association football defenders
FC Zorya Luhansk players
Ukrainian Premier League players
Sportspeople from Chernihiv Oblast
21st-century Ukrainian people